Michael Middleton (born 1949) is a British businessman and father of Catherine, Princess of Wales.

Michael or Mike Middleton may also refer to:

 Michael Middleton (priest) (born 1940), English Anglican priest, Archdeacon of Swindon, 1992–1997
 Michael Middleton (academic), American academic lawyer and former interim president of the University of Missouri
 Mike Middleton (American football) (born 1969), American football player

See also
 Michael Middleton Dwyer (born 1954), American architect